The 2017 Zambia Super League was the 56th season of the Zambian top-tier football league. The season began on 8 April 2017.

League table

References

Zambia Super League
Football
Zambia